Tarrant is a city in Jefferson County, Alabama, bordering Birmingham to the north. At the 2020 census, the population was 6,124. It is home to the ABC Coke plant owned by the Drummond Company, "the largest single producer of foundry coke in the U.S.".

Geography
Tarrant is located at  (33.587546, -86.766219).

Demographics

2000 census
At the 2000 census, there were 7,022 people, 2,896 households, and 1,922 families living in the city. The racial makeup of the city was 79.14% White, 18.73% Black or African American, 0.37% Native American, 0.14% Asian, 0.01% Pacific Islander, 0.84% from other races, and 0.77% from two or more races. 1.71% of the population were Hispanic or Latino of any race.

Of the 2,896 households 28.3% had children under the age of 18 living with them, 45.5% were married couples living together, 17.0% had a female householder with no husband present, and 33.6% were non-families. 29.7% of households were one person and 15.2% were one person aged 65 or older. The average household size was 2.42 and the average family size was 3.01.

The age distribution was 24.3% under the age of 18, 8.3% from 18 to 24, 28.1% from 25 to 44, 21.9% from 45 to 64, and 17.3% 65 or older. The median age was 38 years. For every 100 females, there were 88.5 males. For every 100 females age 18 and over, there were 85.6 males.

The median household income was $29,380 and the median family income  was $32,392. Males had a median income of $30,015 versus $22,215 for females. The per capita income for the city was $14,149. About 14.9% of families and 16.2% of the population were below the poverty line, including 22.8% of those under age 18 and 11.1% of those age 65 or over.

2010 census
At the 2010 census, there were 6,397 people, 2,307 households, and 1,520 families living in the city. The racial makeup of the city was 52.3% Black or African American, 39.0% White, 0.8% Native American, 0.3% Asian, 0.8% Pacific Islander, 5.3% from other races, and 1.5% from two or more races. 9.0% of the population were Hispanic or Latino of any race.

Of the 2,307 households 30.6% had children under the age of 18 living with them, 30.1% were married couples living together, 29.3% had a female householder with no husband present, and 34.1% were non-families. 29.1% of households were one person and 11.7% were one person aged 65 or older. The average household size was 2.72 and the average family size was 3.38.

The age distribution was 28.5% under the age of 18, 9.7% from 18 to 24, 24.6% from 25 to 44, 24.0% from 45 to 64, and 13.2% 65 or older. The median age was 34.1 years. For every 100 females, there were 84.0 males. For every 100 females age 18 and over, there were 88.0 males.

The median household income was $28,385 and the median family income  was $30,938. Males had a median income of $25,451 versus $25,521 for females. The per capita income for the city was $13,990. About 25.0% of families and 30.2% of the population were below the poverty line, including 50.3% of those under age 18 and 6.9% of those age 65 or over.

2020 census

As of the 2020 United States census, there were 6,124 people, 2,206 households, and 1,203 families residing in the city.

Government

Tarrant uses the mayor-council form of government. The city council consists of five members. The city is divided into five geographic districts with each one electing a council member to represent it on the city council. The election cycle for the mayor and council members is every four years during the same years as presidential elections.

The current mayor is Wayman Newton, who is in his first term. Members of the City Council are Veronica Freeman (District 1), Mayor Pro Tempore Tracie B. Threadford (District 2), Cathy Anderson (District 3), Deborah Matthews (District 4), and Tommy Bryant (District 5).

Tarrant has a new City Hall that opened in 2021 located at 1133 East Lake Boulevard, next to Kessler's Pharmacy. The previous city hall, located at 1604 Pinson Valley Parkway, has been sold to Fitzgerald Peterbilt of Birmingham, a truck dealership.

Tarrant has full-time police and fire departments. Both departments are located within the Tarrant Public Safety Building located at 2593 Commerce Circle.

History
A contest was held to name the new town in 1915. Several people suggested Tarrant in honor of Benjamin Tarrant, who had lived in this community most of his life. Other sources claim the city was named for Felix I. Tarrant, President of National Cast Iron Pipe Company, which built the first major industrial plant in the area in 1912. On August 17, 1918 Tarrant became an incorporated city. Its first mayor was George Washington Thomason.  The first census was taken in 1920 and gave Tarrant City a population of 734. From its incorporation until the 1980s, the community went by Tarrant City until it was shortened to Tarrant by the 1990 U.S. Census.

Economy

The town is home to the ABC Coke plant owned by the Drummond Company. According to Forbes, it is "the largest single producer of foundry coke in the U.S.".

Notable people
Jimmy Bryant, singer, arranger, and composer
James D. Martin (1918-2017), a politician and representative in the United States House of Representatives

Climate
The climate in this area is characterized by hot, humid summers and generally mild to cool winters.  According to the Köppen Climate Classification system, Tarrant has a humid subtropical climate, abbreviated "Cfa" on climate maps.

References

External links

City of Tarrant - Official site.
Tarrant City Schools

Cities in Alabama
Cities in Jefferson County, Alabama
Birmingham metropolitan area, Alabama
Populated places established in 1912
1912 establishments in Alabama